The Akron Zips baseball team is the varsity intercollegiate athletic team representing the University of Akron in Akron, Ohio, United States. The team plays in the National Collegiate Athletic Association (NCAA) at the Division I level as a member of the Mid-American Conference (MAC). The program plays at Skeeles Field, which had been the Zips' home from 1967 to 2015.

The program was established in early 1873 during the school's first academic year and played in the Ohio Athletic Conference (OAC) from 1954 to 1966, the Ohio Valley Conference from 1981 through 1987, and the Mid-Continent Conference for the 1990, 1991, and 1992 seasons. The Zips began competition in the MAC in 1993 and were placed in the East Division when it was created in 2000. The team had one appearance in the NCAA Division I Baseball Championship, which came in 1996 following their only MAC Tournament Championship. Additionally, the Zips won the 1954 OAC championship and the 1991 Mid-Continent Conference title.

On July 10, 2015, Akron announced the baseball program would be eliminated, effective immediately, after having fielded the sport since 1873 and uninterrupted since 1947. The university cited budget problems as the main reason for ending the program. A group of baseball alumni formed in an effort to try to save the program. Players were permitted to remain on scholarship to finish their degree, though most transferred to other schools to continue their playing careers.

On September 19, 2017, the university announced baseball would return for the 2019–20 academic year.

It was announced in Fall of 2018 that the baseball team, resuming play in 2020, would be led by Head coach Chris Sabo, former Major League All-Star and Rookie of the year. His assistants would be Associate Head Coach Jordon Banfield and Pitching Coach Dan McKinney.

, Akron and Northern Illinois are the only current or former MAC schools not to have a player named the MAC Baseball Player of the Year or MAC Baseball Pitcher of the Year since those awards were first given in 1986 and 1988 respectively.

Major League Baseball
Akron has had 22 Major League Baseball Draft selections since the draft began in 1965.

References

External links
 

 
Baseball teams established in 1873
Baseball teams disestablished in 2015